Mtwara Region (Mkoa wa Mtwara in Swahili)  is one of Tanzania's 31 administrative regions. The regional capital is the municipality of Mtwara. Mtwara Region is home to one of the most infuluencial people in Tanzania, the Makonde. Mtwara is home to Tanzania's 4th president Benjamin Mkapa and is home to a number of influential artists. The boundary with Mozambique to the south is formed by the Ruvuma River. To the west, Mtwara is bordered by Ruvuma Region, to the north by Lindi Region, and to the east is the Indian Ocean.

Mtwara Region is home for being the nation's largest producer of Cashew nuts. According to the 2012 national census, the region had a population of 1,270,854, which was lower than the pre-census projection of 1,374,767. For 2002-2012, the region's 1.2 percent average annual population growth rate was the 26th highest in the country. It was also the fourteenth most densely populated region with 76 people per square kilometer.

Population
The native peoples of the Mtwara Region are the Makonde, the Yao and the Makua. The Makonde are the dominant people group Mtwara Region and are native to east and central Mtwara, specifically in Mtwara-Mikindani District, Mtwara District, Newala, and Tandahimba districts. As of 1967 the Makonde made up 60% of the region. The second-largest group in terms of the territory is the Makua people who are native to Nanyumbu and Masasi Districts. The Yao are native to parts Tandahimba District. Since 1988 the region has been facing mass migration as younger people seek economic opportunities in Dar es Salaam creating a vibrant Makonde community in Temeke District of Dar es Dalaam especially in Mbagala, which is named after the Mbagala River located in Mtwara Region.

History

Groundnut scheme during the British colonial occupation 
In 1948, the British Government formulated the "Tanganyika groundnut scheme" through the Overseas Food Corporation (OFC).  The purpose was to alleviate the worldwide shortage of vegetable oils; however, inadequate research and adverse environmental conditions due to poor planning resulted in the complete and disastrous failure of the scheme.  In this region the exported crop was to go through the port of Mtwara which was created for the scheme and linked to the growing areas near Nachingwea by a new railway.

Mtwara was once part of Lindi Region until 1971.

Geography
Mtwara is both the most eastern and southern region in the country. The region is located between 10 and 11 degrees south of the Equator. An area occupying 1.9% of the country. In comparison Mtwara is slightly smaller than the African nation of Eswatini  at 17,230 square kilometers. Mtwara's central area is of high elevation, home to the Makonde plateau with Mtwara Region's highest point being Masasi peak at 837 meters above sea level. The largest and longest river in Mtwara Region is the Ruvuma River which is fed by the Mbangala River within the region as one of Ruvuma's many tributaries.

Climate
The rainy season, which runs from November/December to April/May, has only one peak, which occurs in January but can also occur in February or March. The overall amount of annual precipitation varies with height. Rainfall in the Mtwara district ranges from 935 mm to 116 mm in the highlands and plateau. At Masasi Mission, the rainfall is 893 mm, whereas at Newala, it is 1001 mm. It also ranges between Mtopwa and Lukwika Mission, ranging from 1133 mm to 832 mm.Similarly, the highest monthly mean temperature at Mtwara on the seashore in December is 27 degrees Celsius, while the lowest monthly mean temperature is 23 degrees Celsius in July. In Mtwara, relative humidity ranges from 87 percent in March to 79 percent in October. Inland, temperatures and humidity are lower.

Geology
Soils are determined by geology. There are two geological zones in the region, resulting in two geologically determined soil types. The first zone is the coastal sedimentary deposit, which stretches 31 125 kilometers from the Indian Ocean to the tip of Newala's Makonde Plateau. Deep, well-drained, sandy soils with poor fertility and moisture holding capacity are produced in this zone. Sandstones are used to make them. Marine heavy clay soils, also known as vertisols, are found in some regions. Coastal limestones also provide red, well-drained soils with a thick texture.
The second zone extends west of the coastal sediments geologically. Gneisses and granulites make up this zone of pre-cambrian basement rocks. The soils in this basement are diverse. To the north of Masasi town, there are deep, well-drained red clays. These are the best soils in the area since they are most suited to the region's upland crops. Course-grained sandy soils are common south of Masasi.

The region is separated into two sections in terms of topography. The coastal plain's landforms are complicated. Second, at 300mm to 400mm, the Makonde Plateau dominates the basement plain. It's mostly low-lying, with scattered rocky outcroppings and steep riverbanks.
The western part, which is beyond the Makonde Plateau, flows to the south via the Ruvuma River's tributaries. The Makonde Plateau is drained by the Maombi and Mbuo rivers.

Economy
Mtwara, like the rest of Tanzania, is mostly a farming community.Farming is the main source of income for the region's residents. Agribusiness employs over 92 percent of the population, in addition to other rural activities such as fishing, beekeeping, and small-scale manufacturing. Arable land makes up about 85 percent of the region's total area. However, only about a quarter of this is cultivated. The average farm size per rural home (169,482 households - 1988 Census) is projected to be 1.5 ha, with an average of 4.4 people.

Mechanization and oxenization of farms are still developing. In this area, the hand hoe is the most popular agricultural implement. Cassava, millet, and sorghum are all important food crops. Maize has only recently gained popularity. The most important cash crop in the area is cashew nuts. Groundnuts and sesame are two others. Because livestock rearing is not a common practice among the people of the region, its economic contribution is negligible. The cashewnut crop, which accounts for about 25% of the region's GDP, is one of Mtwara's significant contributors. The Mtwara Region produces 40% of the country's cashew nut production. Tanzanian cashew nut production is mostly for export. Domestically, only a small portion of the yield is consumed. The Mtwara Region is officially recognized as the country's leading cashew nut grower. This region produces roughly half of the country's output. Newala district produces more over half of the region's cashewnut harvest. Masasi comes in second with a 29 percent contribution, and Mtwara district comes in last with a 19 percent average contribution.

The mining industry in the region has a bright future. On a limited scale, 35 minerals have been discovered and mined. The Masasi District has been mining sapphire, christalbella, alexandrite, tourmaline, and rhodolite since 1995.

National Parks and Forest Reserves
Mtwara Region is home to the Mnazi Bay-Ruvuma Estuary Marine Park that is one of the largest marine parks in the country. The marine park is a sanctuary for breeding Humpback whales.  Forest reserves occupy about 8.33 percent of the region's 1,672,000 ha of land. This area is 139,295 hectares. Masasi district has the greatest amount of forest cover in the region. The central government manages 130,545 hectares of forest reserves. This equates to 93.7 percent. District councils possess another 8,749 hectares, or 6.3 percent of total forest reserves. In total, there are 16 forest reserves in the region. The majority of them are located in the Masasi district.

Administrative divisions

Districts
Mtwara Region is divided into two towns (Mtwara Municipal and Masasi Town) and seven districts, each administered by a council:

Notable Persons from Mtwara Region
 Benjamin Mkapa, former Tanzanian president. 
 Harmonize, Tanzanian musician. 
 A.Y, Tanzanian rapper
 Hasnain Murji, former member of parliament of Tanzania

References

External links
 

 
Regions of Tanzania